Odorrana tiannanensis is a species of frog in the family Ranidae that is found in southern China, northern Laos, and northern Vietnam. It is an uncommon species that appears to be in decline, at least in China. It is threatened by habitat loss and collection for consumption as food.

References

tiannanensis
Amphibians described in 1980
Amphibians of China
Amphibians of Laos
Amphibians of Vietnam
Taxonomy articles created by Polbot